The European Democrats were a loose association of conservative political parties in Europe.  It was a political group in the European Parliament from 1979 until 1992, when it became a subgroup of the European People's Party–European Democrats (EPP-ED) group. The European Democrats continued to exist as a political group in the Parliamentary Assembly of the Council of Europe (PACE) until 2014, when it became the European Conservatives Group.

European Democrats in the European Parliament

1979–1992
The European Democratic Group (ED) was formed on 17 July 1979 by British Conservative Party, Danish Conservative People's Party and other MEPs after their success in the 1979 elections. It supplanted the earlier European Conservative Group.

In the late seventies and early eighties, the ED was the third-largest political group in the European Parliament.

However, the group saw its membership fall sharply in the late 1980s, as many centre-right members moved to the rival European People's Party (EPP), dominated by the Christian Democratic Union of Germany (CDU), Italian Christian Democrats and the ideology of Christian democracy in general. The ED had been somewhat further from the political centre and less pro-European than the EPP. Largely isolated, even hardline eurosceptics like Margaret Thatcher conceded that the British Conservatives could not be effectively heard from such a peripheral group.

1992–1999
On 1 May 1992, the ED (now largely composed of UK Conservative Party members) dissolved, and its remaining members were accorded "associated party" status in the European People's Party Group; that is, being part of the parliamentary group without retaining actual membership in the EPP Europarty organisation. This was considered essential for the Conservatives, as the EPP was generally seen as quite favourable to European integration, a stance at odds with their core ideology. The Conservatives' relationship to the EPP would become a sore point in the following years, particularly for the eurosceptic general membership in Britain. Then-leader of the British Conservative Party William Hague hoped to put the issue to rest by negotiating a new arrangement in 1999 by which the EPP's parliamentary group would rebrand itself as the European People's Party–European Democrats (EPP-ED), with the "European Democrat" nomenclature returning after a seven-year hiatus.  This was intended to nominally underscore the Conservatives' status apart from the rest of EPP, and it was hoped that with the coming enlargement of the European Union numerous newly involved right-wing parties, averse to the EPP proper for its perceived European federalism, would be willing to instead enter the ED subgroup, growing the overall alignment.

1999–2009
The arrangement proved to do little to appease opposition. Hague's successor, Iain Duncan Smith, made a concerted drive at one point to resurrect the European Democratic Group, but backed off when it became clear that Conservative MEPs would not move voluntarily. The hope that multiple Central and European parties would join ED also proved to be dubious, as only the Czech Civic Democratic Party took up the offer, with the remainder joining EPP proper or other groups such as Union for Europe of the Nations (UEN) or Independence and Democracy (IND/DEM). Meanwhile, the ED remained a more eurosceptic subgroup within the broader EPP-ED bloc that contributed slightly more than 10% of its total MEPs.  It resisted the trend of incorporating as a European political party.

During the 2005 Conservative leadership contest, eventual winner David Cameron pledged to withdraw the Conservatives from the EPP-ED group, while opponent David Davis argued in a letter to the editor of The Daily Telegraph that the current ED arrangement allowed the Conservatives to maintain suitable distance from EPP while still having influence in the largest parliamentary grouping.  Conservative/EPP-ED MEP Martin Callanan responded in that paper the following day:

The Czech Civic Democratic Party (ODS), the Law and Justice (PiS) of Poland and the Rally For France party were among the first to discuss forming a breakaway group under the Movement for European Reform. Sir Reg Empey, Leader of the Ulster Unionist Party (UUP) has committed his party thereunto  Its position would be that the European Union should exist, but as a looser supranational organisation than at present, making the group less eurosceptic than the UEN and IND/DEM groups. Some members from the above parties founded a new organization, the Alliance for an Open Europe, in the midst of this debate, with broadly similar objectives.

Cameron initially intended to form the new group in 2006, though this aspiration had to be cancelled due to their main prospective partners, the ODS and PiS, being unable or unwilling to break away from their then-groupings; the new grouping was put on hiatus until the 2009 European elections. By then, new factors—including the collapse of the UEN group—made conditions for forming a new political grouping much more favourable. On 22 June 2009, the founder members of the European Conservatives and Reformists (ECR) group, all signatories of the Prague Declaration announced that they were to leave the EPP-ED, and in virtue of that fact, the European Democrats movement. This announcement ended the 30-year existence of the European Democrats in the European Parliament.

Former member parties
The following political parties were associated with the European Democrats at some point:

European Democrats in PACE (Parliamentary Assembly of the Council of Europe)

The European Democrat Group in the Parliamentary Assembly of the Council of Europe was founded as the Group of Independent Representatives in 1970 by British and Scandinavian members of PACE, having about 35–40 members from the UK, Ireland, Norway, Denmark, Turkey, Sweden and Switzerland. It adopted the European Democrats Group name in September 1980, later becoming the European Conservatives Group in 2014.

Sources
Political Groups of the European Parliament
Development of Political Groups in the European Parliament
Europe Politique
European Parliament MEP Archives
Democracy in the European Parliament

See also

 Alliance for an Open Europe
 Movement for European Reform
 European People's Party–European Democrats

References

External links
European Democrats official website 
European Democrat Group in the Parliamentary Assembly of the Council of Europe

Former European Parliament party groups
Conservatism in Europe
European People's Party–European Democrats
Organizations established in 1979